"Lemonade" (stylized in all caps) is a song by Scottish producer SOPHIE. It was released as a single on 4 August 2014 by the label Numbers, and was backed by the B-side "Hard". The single features vocal contributions from Nabihah Iqbal on "Lemonade" and PC Music artist GFOTY on "Hard". The song appeared on various best-of year-end single polls. "Lemonade" was subsequently featured in a 2015 McDonald's television advert.

Reception
In a positive review, Resident Advisor stated that "this twisted little banger is bound to turn many listeners off—among its parts are high-pitched vocals barking out phrases like 'ca-ca-candy boys' and synths that fizz like pop rocks." AllMusic noted that "both songs schizophrenically flitted between bubblegum pop hooks and more aggressive elements, and both became huge critical successes." Complex described "Lemonade" as "unashamedly silly and hyperactive."

Both tracks appeared on the Billboard Twitter Real-Time charts. "Lemonade" and "Hard" placed 68th and 91st respectively on the 2014 Pazz & Jop critics poll. "Lemonade" was included in the top ten of year-end singles lists by The Washington Post, Resident Advisor, and Complex; "Hard" was included in the top ten on lists by Dazed and Dummy. Pitchfork ranked "Lemonade"/"Hard" at 21 on its list of the best songs of 2014.

"Lemonade" appeared in a 2015 commercial for McDonald's to promote the brand's lemonade.

Following Sophie's death in 2021, "Lemonade" posthumously entered the UK Physical Singles chart at #44, and the UK Vinyl Singles Chart at #37

Track listing

12" single
"Lemonade" – 1:58
"Hard" – 2:54

Digital download
"Lemonade" – 1:58
"Hard" – 2:54

Credits and personnel
Sophie – production, composition
Nabihah Iqbal – vocals

References

2014 singles
2014 songs
Sophie (musician) songs
McDonald's advertising
Song recordings produced by Sophie (musician)
Songs used as jingles
Songs written by Sophie (musician)
Songs about restaurants